City Island station, is a former railway station within Pelham Bay Park, along the Hell Gate Line in the Bronx, New York. A larger stone station house was designed for the station by Cass Gilbert and built in 1908, remaining in use up until the 1930s. The station is along what is currently Amtrak's Northeast Corridor.

History 
The original station was built in the early 1870s in the then Town of Pelham, for the Harlem River and Port Chester Railroad, a railroad between New York City and Port Chester, New York. In 1873, the line opened as part of the New York, New Haven and Hartford commuter railroad service. Between 1884 to 1919, the Pelham Park and City Island Railway ran between this station and Marshall's Corner on City Island, Bronx, extending to the end of City Island at Belden Point by 1892. The line opened from the Cass Gilbert-designed Bartow station to Marshall's Corner on May 20, 1887. Five days later operations were extended across the bridge to City Island and along City Island Avenue to Brown's Hotel.

Etymology of original name 
Bartow station is named after the small hamlet which sat near it, once referred to as Bartow and Bartow-on-the-Sound.

References 

Cass Gilbert buildings
Former railway stations in New York (state)
Pelham Bay Park
Railway stations in the Bronx
Stations along New York, New Haven and Hartford Railroad lines
Stations on the Northeast Corridor